Pilar, officially the Municipality of Pilar, is a 1st class municipality in the province of Sorsogon, Philippines. According to the 2020 census, it has a population of 75,793 people. 

Pilar's economy is mainly agricultural. Despite efforts on multiplicity, this town is still dependent on the monoculture of coconut.

Geography

Barangays

Pilar is subdivided into 49 barangays. In 1957 the sitios of Naspi and Calaguitan were separated from the barrio of Putiao and converted into the barrio of Naspi.

Climate

Demographics

Economy

Tourism

Though whale sharks are more associated with the town of Donsol, whale sharks can also be seen in Pilar Bay near San Antonio. Interaction with the whale sharks is regulated by the local department office. With the help of WWF, strict guidelines were developed to protect the sharks. These include limiting the number of swimmers per boat, no scuba divers and staying further than three meters away from the sharks. In practice, this rule is almost never applied. As many as 14 boats at a time may 'mob' a shark, with up to 30 or 40 swimmers following the shark on the surface.  In recent years the number of male sharks has out-numbered female sharks by 20:1. The females that are seen are generally large mature adults in the 7m ~ 9m range. Increasing numbers of sharks show propeller marks on their backs. Anecdotal evidence from local fishermen suggests that prop strikes are from fishing boats in the off-season, rather than from tourist boats in the main January–May tourist season.

References

External links
 Pilar Profile at PhilAtlas.com
 [ Philippine Standard Geographic Code]
 Philippine Census Information
 Local Governance Performance Management System

Municipalities of Sorsogon